Spenceley Glacier is a glacier 6 nautical miles (11 km) long, flowing northwest along the southwest flank of Salvesen Range to Brøgger Glacier, in the south part of South Georgia. Surveyed by the South Georgia Survey (SGS) under Duncan Carse in the period 1951–57, and named for George Spenceley, photographer, mountaineer on the SGS, 1955–56 and member of the Yorkshire Ramblers' Club and Alpine Club.

See also
 List of glaciers in the Antarctic
 Glaciology

References

Glaciers of South Georgia